Sergei Vasilyevich Krestenenko (born 25 June 1956) is a Russian footballer and later manager.

References

1956 births
Living people
Soviet footballers
Russian footballers
FC Salyut Belgorod players
FC Torpedo Moscow players
FC Dynamo Stavropol players
FC Dynamo Moscow players
FC Fakel Voronezh players
FC Okzhetpes players
FC Spartak Moscow players
FC Lokomotiv Moscow players
FC Metalist Kharkiv players
FC Ros Bila Tserkva players
Russian football managers
FC Fakel Voronezh managers
Association footballers not categorized by position